= Peabody Preserve (Tarrytown, New York) =

US natural preserve

Coordinates: 41.1002°N 73.8653°W

Peabody Preserve is a 39-acre (0.16 km^{2}) natural land area located in between the Hudson River and Fremont Pond, in Sleepy Hollow, New York, United States, owned by the Public Schools of the Tarrytowns. The Preserve contains hiking trails, multiple habitats, wetlands, a retaining pool and diverse species of flora and fauna. The Reserve was created to protect and restore native ecological communities and wetlands, serve as an outdoor classroom for students and teachers, and provide recreational opportunities to all visitors.

== Wildlife ==
Many wildlife species native to New York, can be found around the Peabody Preserve; such as white tailed deer, beavers, red tail hawk, and great blue herons.

- Fish
- Frogs
- Turtle
- Songbirds
- Birds of prey
- Insects
- Skunks
- Raccoons

== Education resource ==
The Peabody Preserve serves as an outdoor classroom. The Peabody site provides experiential learning for local schools and colleges in Tarrytown and Sleepy Hollow; including the greater Westchester County area.

=== Class projects ===
Class projects which local schools use for studying include:

- Environmental protection
- Preserving resources
- Creating an inventory of flora, fauna, and wildlife
- Measuring and documenting microorganisms
- Stream composition
- Studying laws and regulations of conservation
- Site assessments

== Water systems and water quality ==
- Stream and spring
- Upper Wetland
- Retention pool
- Fremont Pond
- Lower Wetland
- Hudson River
